Edward "Ted" and Pat Jones-Confluence Point State Park is a public recreation area located on the north side of the Missouri River at its confluence with the Mississippi River in St. Charles County, Missouri. The state park encompasses  of shoreline and bottomland and is managed by the Missouri Department of Natural Resources, which "plans to restore a natural floodplain reminiscent of what Lewis and Clark might have seen along the lower Missouri River." The park is part of the Mississippi Greenway (formerly known as the Confluence Greenway) and sits opposite the Columbia Bottom Conservation Area on the south bank of the Missouri River. Park trails will eventually connect with the statewide Katy Trail.

History

The Lewis and Clark Expedition began at the confluence in 1804, and the explorers returned there at the end of their journey. Following the purchase of the site through the aid of a grant from the Danforth Foundation, the Western Rivers Conservancy conveyed the land to the Missouri Department of Natural Resources and the Metropolitan Parks and Recreation District in 2001. The park opened May 9, 2004. It is named for Edward Jones Investments heir Edward D. "Ted" Jones and his wife Pat Jones, who donated $2.2 million for development of the Katy Trail.

Activities and amenities
The area offers short trails, interpretive kiosks, and birdwatching.

References

External links

Confluence Point State Park Missouri Department of Natural Resources
Confluence Point State Park Map Missouri Department of Natural Resources

State parks of Missouri
Protected areas on the Mississippi River
Protected areas established in 2001
Protected areas of St. Charles County, Missouri
History of Greater St. Louis
2001 establishments in Missouri